Ma Lianliang (28 February 1901 – 16 December 1966) was a Peking opera singer.


Life
Ma was best known for his "old man" roles  lǎoshēng) and was considered one of Peking Opera's "Four Great Beards"   , along with Tan Fuying, Yang Baosen, and Xi Xiaobo. He served as a mentor to Li Yuru. For most of his life, he stayed in mainland China, except for 1948–1950, when he lived in Hong Kong (which was still a colony of Britain) for medical treatment.

During Mao Zedong's cultural revolution, Ma was named a "poisonous weed" after having appeared in a production that Mao believed implicitly criticized him. A group of revolutionaries called Red Guards assaulted Ma in the street and broke his leg. Before the end of the year, he would die of his injuries.

References

External links
 "马连良" on Baike.com 

1901 births
1966 deaths
20th-century Chinese male actors
20th-century Chinese  male singers
Hui male actors
Hui singers
Chinese male Peking opera actors
Male actors from Beijing
Singers from Beijing
People persecuted to death during the Cultural Revolution